Clematis ochroleuca is a species of flowering plant in the buttercup family, Ranunculaceae, known by the common names curlyheads  and erect silky leather-flower.  It is native to North America with a distribution on the east coast of the United States from Long Island to northern Georgia.

References

ochroleuca
Flora of the Southeastern United States
Flora of the Northeastern United States
Flora without expected TNC conservation status